Formula Off Road is a form of off-road racing 4x4 motorsport. It started in Iceland and has gained popularity in the Nordic countries and has spread across America since 2016.

Formula Off Road is a form of motorsport where drivers compete in
precision driving through steep hills and extreme terrain with 4WD
vehicles.

Origin
Formula Off Road originates in Iceland. In the hopes of raising funds, groups of Icelandic rescue workers started to show their 4WD cars in action in the Icelandic hills. It soon became more of a competition between the teams, and soon they started building specially made vehicles for just this purpose.

The story of Formula Off Road began in Iceland May 2, 1965 when the first Formula Off Road competition was hosted by Bifreiðaklúbbur Reykjavíkur (Reykjavik's Car Club), or BKR for short. After that race Egill Gunnar Ingólfsson claimed the title First Winner of Formula Off Road. With that competition, Þorkell Guðnason and fellow members of BKR made the foundation of what we call today a Formula Off Road Championship.

BKR kept hosting competition for years to come, but in 1969 The Volunteer Rescue Team Stakkur in Keflavík begun to host Formula Off Road competitions for fund-raising and soon The Volunteer Rescue Team on Hella began to do the same. Formula Off Road competition have been a big part of fund-raising for the Rescue Teams throughout the years.

With the advent of LIA 1979 the first Icelandic Championship was held and the first Icelandic Champion was Benedikt Eyjólfsson (See results here)

At the beginning there was only one class but in 1985 the second class was added to the competition because some of the contestants began to drive with multi-paddle tires. That's when Modified Class and Unlimited Class came to exists. During these years contestants arrived on their daily drive cars, took off the equipment they didn't need in the race itself, changed their tires to multi-paddle and started the race.

Back in the day roll-bars were the only requirement but not the complete roll-cage as it is today. It is worth noting that in 50 years of Icelandic Formula Off Road there hasn't been any serious injuries that can be traced to lack of security measures in the cars.

Formula Off-road competitions have always been a great part of the Icelandic motor-sport and is well known all over the world.

The first Formula Off-road competition abroad was in Sjöbo in Sweden, 29 July 1990. Jeppaklubbur Reykjavíkur organized the competition in cooperation with Wettern Offroaders. Formula Off-road then started to occur regularly in Sweden, Finland, Norway and Denmark. From 2000-2008 was competed in the Nordic Championship in all Scandinavian countries, apart from Iceland. Yet the World Cup tournament was held in Iceland in 1997-2008 (see results here) but not all Scandinavian countries participated until 2004. Back in 2009 they merged all these tournaments together and gave it the name NEZ (see results here)

On 4 June 2000, there was the first and only Formula Offroad race in Swindon, England.

In 2016, 1st-2 October, will be the first Formula Off-road competition in the Bikini Bottoms Off-Road Park in Tennessee, USA.

July 21, 2018 in Akranes, Iceland, Andrew Blackwood became the first American to compete in Icelandic Formula Offroad Competition driving the Unlimited-class Draumurinn. A car well known in Icelandic competition, Draumurinn (The Dream) is owned by Gestur J. Ingolfsson and is based in Akureyri, Iceland.

The competition's structure is more or less the same as it was in the beginning. There are marked tracks and penalties for stopping, driving in reverse and driving with one wheel on or outside the markings of the track.

Classes
There are currently three competing classes
in Formula Off Road.

 Street Legal Class - Equipped with lights, license plates and subject to annual inspection these vehicles are road-safe and often street driven just as they are raced.
 Modified Class - the shape of the body must resemble a mass-produced vehicle. Bonnet, side body panels, and front and rear fenders must be installed and resemble the original vehicle.
 Unlimited Class - the major league class

The difference between the classes is mainly in the tyres. Unlimited Class 4x4s are allowed to use paddle tyres which dig into the earth between hops and short flights.

The two classes compete on similar tracks. For both classes the length of body must at least cover the wheelbase of the vehicle.

Location

Formula Off Road takes place in closed areas with no road traffic. Rock mines, for example, which are usually just outside towns, are often used because they offer the right kind of terrain. Mostly the surface is driven just as it is but occasionally it is modified slightly for spectator experience. The tracks themselves are makeshift, marked by old tires, flags or sticks. On the day of the event the course marshal takes the drivers through the tracks on foot and explains how they are laid out and how they are supposed to be driven.

Competitors
Each driver has a small team of assistants. They help out by preparing the 4x4 and making repairs as needed during competition. The truck needs to be large enough to carry the driver. They  also need a "mobile garage", welding shop and spare parts to make the repairs during competition.

Risks
As spectacular as Formula Off Road appears, there have been very few serious accidents. The drivers are protected by a roll cage, a full-face helmet with neck support, five-point harnesses, a homologated bucket seat, flame resistant overalls, shoes and gloves, special arm restrainers and other safety measures that are required by the rules.

Spectators can sometimes be pelted with sand, earth or small stones kicked up by the rear tires.

Points
Points are given in a similar way to other types of motorsport. 20 points for the winner, 15 for second place, 12 for third and less for every subsequent place. There is often also a special award given for the most spectacular driving in each class. There is not a lot of money in the sport and the winner only gets a medal and a cup, as expensive project.

Formula Off Road rules
Formula Off Road is a real test in off-road driving on closed tracks. Each competition is held in accordance with the FIA International Sporting Code (ISC) and has six to eight tracks. On each track a driver can earn up to 350 points depending on how far they go or if they get any points deducted for faults.
Each driver has to go as far as they can and gets no help from the team during the attempt. Stopping incurs a penalty of 10 points. Backing up is allowed but incurs a
40-point penalty. Touching a marker is 20 penalty points. Driving over a marker is 50 points or 100 if only one wheel is still on the course. Faults at the final gate incur only half as many points.
Timed courses give points according to time. First place = 350 points. Other drivers are deducted 1 point for every 1/10th of a second slower than the fastest time.
The highest total number of points wins.

Vehicles
The Formula Off Road style 4x4 is highly modified. A typical example usually has the following modifications:
 Locked front and rear differentials as well as the centre transfer case. When one tyre is turning they all are.
 Gear ratios are lowered and usually have slightly higher ratios up front. This makes the front wheels turn a little faster and makes the vehicle easier to steer in the extreme situations.
 Engines are eight-cylinder petrol engines. A nitrous system gives an extra couple of hundred bhp when the pedal is floored. Recent seasons (as of 2018) have seen more and more variants with fast spooling turbochargers instead, also making non-V8 base engines viable like the Honda K24 or Volvo T5.
 An automatic transmission with a torque converter with a stall speed of about 5,000rpm. Driveline kicks in around 5,000rpm.
 Sand drag tyres for maximum traction. The Unlimited Class allows the use of paddle tyres that are built on racing slicks with the paddles welded on. The Modified Street Class uses die-cast sand drag tyres with slightly smaller shovels.
 Suspension is made to accommodate fast changing surfaces. The older trucks have coil springs while newer trucks have air springs that are easier to adjust according to each track. A new type of suspension is also being tested by at least one contestant. It's similar to your typical motorcycle, where the shock absorber and the suspension arm is built into a single unit.
 A specially built roll cage is required for all vehicles.
 Steering is hydraulic and not allowed on the street.

See also
 Baja SAE, a similar competition between university teams

References

External links
 FormulaOffroad.org - Official rules and more info
 4x4OffRoads.com - Covers a lot of Formula Off Road events
 FOIceland.com - All information about the Icelandic Formula Off-Road events, news, drivers and cars.

Off-road racing